Orleans Township may refer to:

 Orleans Township, Orange County, Indiana
 Orleans Township, Winneshiek County, Iowa, in Winneshiek County, Iowa
 Orleans Township, Michigan
 Orleans Township, Harlan County, Nebraska

	
Township name disambiguation pages